Mike Milburn (born September 28, 1952) is the Speaker of the House for the Montana 62nd Legislature.  He is a Republican representing Cascade County.  He has been elected for House District 19 four times since 2005.  He is a primary sponsor for a bill to repeal the Montana medical marijuana law.  Milburn serves on the Legislative Administration, Taxation and Rules Committees.

Milburn obtained a bachelor's degree in geology from Montana State University.  He served in the US Air Force from 1975 to 1982 and the National Guard from 1982 to 1998.

References

Living people
1952 births
Montana State University alumni
Politicians from Great Falls, Montana
People from Belleville, Illinois
Speakers of the Montana House of Representatives
Republican Party members of the Montana House of Representatives